Rachals is a surname. Notable people with the surname include:

Otto Rachals (1897–1984), former mayor of Green Bay, Wisconsin
Terri Rachals, former nurse who was accused of killing six people at Phoebe Putney Memorial Hospital in Albany, Georgia

See also
Rachal (surname)